Yenotayevsky District is an administrative and municipal district (raion), one of the eleven in Astrakhan Oblast, Russia. It is located in the west of the oblast. Its administrative center is the rural locality (a selo) of Yenotayevka. Population:  27,625 (2002 Census);  The population of Yenotayevka accounts for 28.4% of the district's total population.

References

Notes

Sources

Districts of Astrakhan Oblast